The 2009 CIS Men's Final 8 Basketball Tournament was held March 13-15, 2009. It was the second of three consecutive CIS Championships to be held at Scotiabank Place in Ottawa, Ontario and was hosted by the Carleton Ravens. The host Ravens won the championship, their sixth in seven years. Stu Turnbull of the Ravens was named tournament MVP.

Championship Bracket

Consolation Bracket

Note: All records are against CIS competition only.

2009
2008–09 in Canadian basketball
Sports competitions in Ottawa